Belorus-Alexandrovka is a rural locality (a village) in Lipovsky Selsoviet, Arkhangelsky District, Bashkortostan, Russia. The population was 86 as of 2010. There is 1 street.

Geography 
Belorus-Alexandrovka is located 28 km north of Arkhangelskoye (the district's administrative centre) by road. Novoshareyevo is the nearest rural locality.

References 

Rural localities in Arkhangelsky District